Nikolai Vladimirovich Semashko (Cyrillic: Николай Владимирович Семашко; 1907 in the Russian Empire – March 4, 1976 in Moscow, Soviet Union) was a Soviet sports administrator. He was the head of the Soviet State Sports Committee (1939–1940 and 1950–1954). He also served as Vice President of the FIBA (1960–1976) and President of the Standing Conference of Europe (current FIBA Europe) (1967–1976). In 2007, he was enshrined as a contributor in the FIBA Hall of Fame.

The prize for the winning team at EuroBasket is called Nikolai Semashko Trophy.

External links
 FIBA Hall of Fame page on Semashko

1907 births
1976 deaths
FIBA Hall of Fame inductees
Soviet basketball people
Soviet sports administrators
Basketball referees
Basketball executives